Jermaine Samuels Jr. (born November 13, 1998) is an American professional basketball player for the Fort Wayne Mad Ants of the NBA G League. He played college basketball for the Villanova Wildcats. Samuels attended The Rivers School and averaged 17.5 points per game as a senior, earning First team All-USA Massachusetts honors. He was highly recruited and committed to play at Villanova over several other schools. Samuels did not play much as a freshman on the team that won the 2018 NCAA Division I men's basketball tournament. As a sophomore, he had an expanded role and averaged 6.4 points per game. Despite a foot injury during his junior season, Samuels averaged 10.7 points per game. He averaged 12 points per game as a senior, and returned for a fifth season of eligibility.

Early life and high school career
Samuels is the son of Taihish and Jermaine Samuels Sr. and grew up in Franklin, Massachusetts. He began dunking the basketball at age 13 after growing from 5'9 to 6'3. Samuels attended The Rivers School, where he was coached by Andrew Mirken, as well as playing basketball in the Amateur Athletic Union  (AAU) for Expressions Elite. In his freshman season, he averaged 19 points per game for The Rivers School. As a sophomore, he had a knee injury which required surgery and six months recovery. Samuels averaged 17.5 points and 12.1 rebounds per game as a senior and was named First team All-USA Massachusetts by USA Today. Samuels committed to playing college basketball for Villanova in November 2016, turning down offers from Indiana, Duke, Kansas, UConn, Georgetown, Arizona State and California. ESPN ranked him the 52nd best recruit in his class. He picked Villanova after visiting the campus in August 2016 and feeling very comfortable around the campus and coaches.

College career

Samuels had a season-high 11 points in a 103–85 win against DePaul on December 27, 2017. However, he fractured his left hand in the game and missed several weeks of playing time. He rejoined the rotation in February 2018 but struggled to receive consistent minutes and did not play in NCAA Tournament victories over West Virginia and Texas Tech. Samuels averaged 1.1 points and 1.2 rebounds per game as a freshman on a team that won the 2018 NCAA Division I Men's Basketball Championship Game.

On February 27, 2019, Samuels scored a season-high 29 points in a 67–61 win against Marquette. He had 12 points and seven rebounds in an NCAA Tournament win over Saint Mary's. Samuels helped Villanova achieve a 26–10 record and win the Big East Conference. He averaged 6.4 points and 5.4 rebounds per game as a sophomore.

Coming into his junior season, Samuels was named to the Preseason Second Team All-Big East alongside teammate Collin Gillespie. Samuels scored 15 points in a 56–55 win against top-ranked Kansas on December 21, 2019, including a three-pointer with 20.5 seconds remaining. On January 18, Samuels scored 19 points including a crucial three-point play in a 61–55 win against UConn. He had 20 points in a 76–61 win over Butler on January 21. On January 28, 2020, Samuels missed a game against St. John's with a sprained foot. Samuels made the game winning three-point play in a 70–69 win over Georgetown on March 7, finishing with 13 points. As a junior, Samuels averaged 10.7 points and 5.5 rebounds per game. He was named to the Second Team All-Big 5.

During the 2020 offseason, Samuels worked on his decision-making and three-point shooting, while struggle to find practice space due to the COVID-19 pandemic. He was named to the preseason Julius Erving Award watchlist. On February 7, 2021, Samuels scored a career-high 32 points and had six rebounds, five assists and three steals in an 84–74 win against Georgetown. As a senior, Samuels averaged 12 points, 6.4 rebounds and 2.5 assists per game, earning All-Big East Honorable Mention recognition. Following the season, he announced he was returning for a fifth season of eligibility.

On December 21, 2021, Samuels surpassed the 1,000 point threshold in a 84–74 win against Xavier.

Professional career

Fort Wayne Mad Ants (2022–present)
On October 24, 2022, Samuels joined the Fort Wayne Mad Ants training camp roster.

National team career
In July and August 2019, Samuels was a part of the United States national team who competed at the Pan American Games in Peru. The team won the bronze medal, defeating the Dominican Republic with nine points from Samuels. He averaged 9.4 points per game during the tournament.

Career statistics

College

|-
| style="text-align:left;"| 2017–18
| style="text-align:left;"| Villanova
| 25 || 0 || 6.1 || .250 || .188 || .625 || 1.2 || .3 || .0 || .1 || 1.1
|-
| style="text-align:left;"| 2018–19
| style="text-align:left;"| Villanova
| 35 || 22 || 22.0 || .448 || .347 || .622 || 5.4 || 1.0 || .4 || .8 || 6.4
|-
| style="text-align:left;"| 2019–20
| style="text-align:left;"| Villanova
| 30 || 30 || 30.3 || .464 || .276 || .727 || 5.5 || 2.0 || .9 || .7 || 10.7
|-
| style="text-align:left;"| 2020–21
| style="text-align:left;"| Villanova
| 25 || 24 || 29.3 || .481 || .371 || .828 || 6.4 || 2.5 || .6 || .3 || 12.0
|-
| style="text-align:left;"| 2021–22
| style="text-align:left;"| Villanova
| 38 || 37 || 29.6 || .472 || .276 || .770 || 6.5 || 1.4 || .8 || .7 || 11.1
|- class="sortbottom"
| style="text-align:center;" colspan="2"| Career
| 153 || 113 || 24.1 || .461 || .306 || .740 || 5.2 || 1.4 || .6 || .5 || 8.5

References

External links
Villanova Wildcats bio

1998 births
Living people
American men's basketball players
Basketball players at the 2019 Pan American Games
Basketball players from Massachusetts
Fort Wayne Mad Ants players
Medalists at the 2019 Pan American Games
Pan American Games bronze medalists for the United States
Pan American Games medalists in basketball
Small forwards
Sportspeople from Middlesex County, Massachusetts
United States men's national basketball team players
Villanova Wildcats men's basketball players